Alaincourt may refer to:

 Alaincourt, Aisne, a commune of the Aisne département in France
 Alaincourt, Haute-Saône, a commune of the Haute-Saône département in France

See also
Alaincourt-la-Côte, a commune of the Moselle département in France